Pignia is former a municipality in the district of Hinterrhein in the Swiss canton of Graubünden.  On 1 January 2009, it was annexed by Andeer.

The municipality was predominantly German-speaking, with a sizable Romansh-speaking minority.

References

External links
 Official Web site

Andeer
Former municipalities of Graubünden